Jan Trlifaj (born 30 December 1954) is a Professor of Mathematics at Charles University whose research interests include Commutative algebra, Homological algebra and Representation theory.

Career and research
Jan Trlifaj studied mathematics at the Faculty of Mathematics and Physics, Charles University, from which he received MSc. in 1979, Ph.D. in 1989 under Ladislav Bican. and Prof. of Mathematics in the field Algebra and number theory in 2009.

In the academic year 1994/95 he had the position as Postdoctoral Fellow of the Royal Society at Department of Mathematics at University of Manchester. In Fall 1998 he received the J.W.Fulbright Scholarship at the Department of Mathematics, University California at Irvine. During Fall 2002 and 2006 he was a visiting professor at Centre de Recerca Matemàtica, Barcelona.
Since 1990, he has completed numerous short term visiting appointments and given over 100 invited lectures at conferences and seminars worldwide.

Since 2017, he is Fellow of Learned Society of the Czech Republic.

He served in the organizing committee of 18th International Conference on
Representations of Algebras (ICRA 2018), held for 250 participants from 34 countries in August 2018 in Prague, Czech Republic.

He has been elected Fellow of the American Mathematical Society (AMS) in 2020, for contributions to homological algebra and tilting theory for non finitely generated modules.

He serves as Member of the Science board for Neuron prize that is awarded to best Czech scientists by Neuron Endowment Fund.

Selected publications

Papers
 1994: 
 1996: 
 2001:  (with Paul C. Eklof),  (with Saharon Shelah)
 2007:  (with Jan Šťovíček)
 2012:  (with Dolors Herbera),  (with Sergio Estrada, Pedro A. Guil Asensio, and Mike Prest)
 2014:  (with Lidia Angeleri Huegel, David Pospíšil, and Jan Šťovíček)
 2016:  (with Alexander Slávik)

Books
 2006, 2012: Approximations and Endomorphism Algebras of Modules, de Gruyter Expositions in Mathematics 41, Vol. 1 - Approximations, Vol. 2 - Predictions, W. de Gruyter Berlin - Boston, xxviii + 972 pp. (with Rüdiger Göbel)

Awards and distinctions
 Prize of the Dean of MFF for the best monograph 2006
 MFF UK Silver medal at the Sexagennial anniversary 
 Fellow of the American Mathematical Society, 2020

References

External links
 
 Personal web page

20th-century Czech mathematicians
21st-century 	Czech mathematicians
Algebraists
Fellows of the American Mathematical Society
Charles University alumni
Living people
1954 births
Czechoslovak mathematicians